"Por Mujeres Como Tú" ("Because of Women Like You") is a song by Mexican singer Pepe Aguilar from his 1998 studio album of the same name. The song won Billboard Latin Music Award for Hot Latin Song of the Year and was nominated in the category of Regional Mexican Hot Latin Track of the Year. It also won the Lo Nuestro Award for Regional Mexican Song of the Year in 1999. In addition, the track was recognized as song of the year on the Regional Mexican field at the ASCAP Latin Awards. In 1999, Puerto Rican salsa singer Tito Rojas covered "Por Mujeres Como Tú" on his studio album, Alegrías y Penas. Rojas' version peaked at #1 on the Tropical Airplay, his second and final #1 before his death. Rojas' cover was nominated in the category Tropical Song of the Year at the 2000 Lo Nuestro Awards, but lost to "Píntame" by Elvis Crespo. It was recognized as one of the best-performing songs of the year at the ASCAP Latin Awards under the salsa category in 2000.

Charts

Weekly charts

Year-end charts

See also
Billboard Hot Latin Songs Year-End Chart
List of Billboard Tropical Airplay number ones of 1999

References

1998 songs
1998 singles
1999 singles
Pepe Aguilar songs
Tito Rojas songs
Spanish-language songs